James or Jim Carroll may refer to:

 James Carroll (actor) (1956–2016), American-born Canadian actor and radio personality
 James Carroll (Australian politician) (1855–1927), Australian politician
 James Carroll (captain) (1840–1912), Irish American steamship captain
 James Carroll (cricketer) (1843–1926), English cricketer
 James Carroll (Dublin politician) (1907–1973), Irish independent politician, represented Dublin South West from 1957 to 1965
 James Carroll (Louth politician) (born 1983), Irish Fianna Fáil Senator from Louth
 James Carroll (Maryland politician) (1791–1873), American
 James Carroll (New Zealand politician) (1857–1926), New Zealand politician
 James Carroll (author) (born 1943), American author, novelist, Roman Catholic dissident, and columnist for the Boston Globe
 James Carroll (scientist) (1854–1907), American scientist
 James Bernard Carroll (1856–1932), Associate Justice of the Massachusetts Supreme Judicial Court
 James H. Carroll (c. 1876–1950), American politician
 James Milton Carroll (1852–1931), Baptist pastor, leader, historian, and author
 James T. Carroll (Los Angeles politician) (1877–1939), member of the Los Angeles City Council
 James T. Carroll (New York politician) (1875–1940), member of the New York State Assembly
 James W. Carroll, American politician, senior White House staffer
 James Marmion Gilmor Carroll (1884–1962), Anglo-Irish Roman Catholic and businessman
 James Rawson Carroll (1830–1911), Irish architect

Jim Carroll 
 Jim Carroll (1949–2009), author, poet and punk musician
 Jim Carroll (American football) (born 1943), former American football linebacker
 Jim Carroll (journalist) (born 1968), Irish music journalist and broadcaster
 Jim Carroll (Australian footballer) (born 1939), Australian rules footballer
 Jim Carroll (Vermont politician) (born 1961), member of the Vermont House of Representatives

See also 
 James Carroll Beckwith (1852–1917), American portrait painter
 James Booker (James Carroll Booker, 1939–1983), American musician